California's 29th district may refer to:

 California's 29th congressional district
 California's 29th State Assembly district
 California's 29th State Senate district